
Gmina Linia is a rural gmina (administrative district) in Wejherowo County, Pomeranian Voivodeship, in northern Poland.

It belongs to bilingual communes in Poland.

The gmina contains part of the protected area called Kashubian Landscape Park.

Villages
Gmina Linia contains the villages and settlements of Dargolewo, Głodnica, Igrzeczna, Kętrzyno, Kobylasz, Leobór, Lewinko, Lewino, Linia, Miłoszewo, Niedźwiadek, Niepoczołowice, Niepoczołowice-Folwark, Osiek, Pobłocie, Potęgowo, Smażyno, Strzepcz, Tłuczewo and Zakrzewo.

Neighbouring gminas
Gmina Linia is bordered by the gminas of Cewice, Kartuzy, Łęczyce, Luzino, Sierakowice and Szemud.

References
Polish official population figures 2006

Linia
Wejherowo County
Kashubia
Bilingual communes in Poland